Návštěvníci (The Visitors) is a Czechoslovak sci-fi TV series filmed between 1981 and 1983 by Czech director Jindřich Polák. The 15 parts were co-produced with television-companies of the Federal Republic of Germany (West Germany at that time), Switzerland and France. As an additional 16th part for Germany a "Making of" was produced under the title "Besuch bei den Besuchern" (Visiting the Visitors). In West Germany the series got the title Die Besucher (The Visitors), in the German Democratic Republic and Australia it was called Expedition Adam 84.

Plot
In the year 2484, humanity is far advanced: it has overcome wars and nation states. People have no worries and can pursue art and science. Earth is governed by the World Council, which is advised by a computer, the Central Brain of Mankind.

At the beginning of the series, the Central Brain of Mankind states that the Earth is threatened by a comet that is expected to shift the Earth's axis during its imminent flyby of the Earth. The World Council is already discussing an evacuation of threatened areas.

Then the academic Filip speaks up. He refers to the genius Adam Bernau, who received the Nobel Prize in 2034. In his memoirs Bernau tells about a formula to move continents and even worlds; he had written it before or after a house fire on his eleventh birthday in three notebooks, which have not been preserved. Unfortunately, the memoir abandons the theme of world-shifting in favor of describing a "silly love" for the girl Ali, as Filip laments. Recognizing a possible alternative to evacuations, the chairman of the World Council has Filip prepare a time travel expedition called "Expedition Adam 84."

In addition to the fussy historian Filip, the expedition members include a self-confident doctor who is given the name "Noll" for the expedition, the amicable technician "Karas" and the soulful documentarian "Katja". Among other things, the house from Bernau's childhood serves as training ground - in the year 2484 it is a museum.

The expedition then travels to the city Kamenice in 1984, when Bernau was 11 years old. Their time-travel apparatus is housed in a contemporary-looking Lada Niva; they pose as surveyors surveying the area for a road to be built. In Kamenice, the expedition meets not only young Adam, a curious rascal, but also his strict and narrow-minded parents, schoolmate Ali, and naive but practical outsider Alois Drchlík. The latter is recognized by the visitors as the Great Teacher, a grandfatherly friend whom Bernau had mentioned in his memoirs. The visitors become friends with Drchlík.

The time travelers have all sorts of difficulties finding their way in 1984. They are inexperienced in handling money and spend it too frivolously; they lose tools of the future such as a laser saw, etc. They also suffer from some mistakes of the Central Brain of Mankind, which, for example, sends them more money, but worthless from 1884. Karas is interested in technology and food and drink of 1984, while Noll and Katja fall in love with inhabitants of Kamenice. Filip keeps ordering them to concentrate on the task of the expedition. He is only interested in Adam Bernau, in whom he sees exclusively the future Nobel Prize winner.

In the end, the visitors are unable to seize any of the three notebooks and travel back disappointed before the real surveyors arrive in Kamenice. Shortly before, they rescue Drchlík from an accident with a tanker truck and take him with them to the year 2484. There Drchlík notices that the Central Brain of Mankind stands asymmetrically and fixes this with a wooden wedge. Set straight, the computer immediately announces that it was mistaken and that the earth is not in danger. The people of the future are relieved and enjoy objects brought by the visitors from the past, such as a Rubik's Cube.

Adam had committed property damage with his girlfriend Ali and was not allowed to see her for a while. In the last scene of the series, the boy tells his girlfriend that during this time he had been working on a formula to shift continent and whole worlds. Ali declares this work finished, since they are together again and he has promised to write her a poem. Together they ride away on bicycles.

Reception
The series has been released in several other European countries, including Hungary, Yugoslavia, Poland, Romania, Bulgaria, and Spain.

Miscellaneous
The soundtrack of the series was released in 1984 on LP Supraphon 1113 3473H, which also included the soundtrack of Létající Čestmír (1984), also composed by Karel Svoboda, a series with the German title Der fliegende Ferdinand (The Flying Ferdinand). The soundtrack was re-issued on CD by Czechoslovak Universal in 2004.

Gadgets and costumes were designed by Theodor Pištěk, later Oscar winner.

The widow of a real professor named Filip sued the creators of the series for alleged profanation of her husband's name. She won, and the main character had to be renamed Professor Richard. This hurt the quality of the sound in the Czech version in the whole series. In the German versions the name was changed to "Philip" to avoid changing the dubbing.

Episode listing

References

External links 
 IMDB Entry
  Facebook group Fan Site
  Expedition Adam 2007

1980s science fiction television series
Czechoslovak television series
1983 Czechoslovak television series debuts
1984 Czechoslovak television series endings
Czech comedy television series
1980s Czechoslovak television series
Jan Švankmajer
Czech time travel television series
Czechoslovak Television original programming